Township 7 is one of thirteen current townships in Benton County, Arkansas, United States. As of the 2010 census, its population was 20,317.

Geography

Cities, towns, and villages
Bella Vista (part of)
Bentonville (small part)
Pea Ridge (most of)

References
 United States Census Bureau 2008 TIGER/Line Shapefiles
 United States Board on Geographic Names (GNIS)
 United States National Atlas

 Census 2010 U.S. Gazetteer Files: County Subdivisions in Arkansas

External links
 US-Counties.com

Townships in Benton County, Arkansas
Townships in Arkansas